Marco Tin Win (born 22 April 1960) is a Myanmar-born prelate of the Catholic Church who was appointed Archbishop of Mandalay in April 2019.

Biography
Marco Tin Win was born in Mon Hla in the district of Shwebo, Myanmar, on 22 April 1960. He studied philosophy and theology at Saint Joseph’s Major Seminary in Yangon. He was ordained a priest on 22 September 1987. He earned a doctorate in philosophy from the Pontifical Urban University, Rome.

He has held a number of pastoral and administrative roles, including diocesan director for interreligious dialogue, rector of the Saint Thomas Preparatory Seminary of Mandalay, diocesan bursar, parish priest of the parish of Mary Help of Christians in Sagaing, and executive secretary of the Episcopal Conference of Yangon. He also held administrative positions with the Episcopal Conference of Burma. He has also worked to establish good relationships with other religious groups, including Muslims, Buddhists, and Hindus. He was secretary of the Office of Inter-Religious Dialogue of the Episcopal Conference as well.

He was vicar general, rector of the Cathedral of Mandalay, and a lecturer in philosophy at Saint Joseph’s Major Seminary in Pyin Oo Lwin when Pope Francis, on 25 April 2019, named him Archbishop of Mandalay.

See also
 Catholic Church in Myanmar

Notes

References

External links

1960 births
Living people
People from Sagaing Region
21st-century Roman Catholic bishops in Myanmar
Pontifical Urban University alumni